Brinsley Ernst Pieter Schwarz (born 25 March 1947, Woodbridge, Suffolk) is an English guitarist and rock musician. 
His family's roots are German.

He formed a band named Kippington Lodge in 1965, which evolved into the band Brinsley Schwarz.  After the band's demise in 1974, Schwarz briefly joined Ducks Deluxe before forming The Rumour and going on to achieve success with Graham Parker as Graham Parker and the Rumour.  He continued to record and tour with Parker following the splitting up of The Rumour in 1980, notably contributing to Parker's The Mona Lisa's Sister album (1988).

He produced some Brinsley Schwarz and Graham Parker albums.

As of 2012, he was back on tour with Ducks Deluxe, and in 2016 toured with Graham Parker and released his first solo album Unexpected. on which he wrote all the songs, played all guitars and bass and sang all the vocals.

Solo discography
 Unexpected (2016) (Self released)
 Tangled (2021)

References

1947 births
Living people
English rock guitarists
English male guitarists
English rock saxophonists
British male saxophonists
People from Woodbridge, Suffolk
People educated at Woodbridge School
Brinsley Schwarz members
The Rumour members
21st-century saxophonists